Yutan may refer to:

Yutan, Nebraska, a city in Saunders County, Nebraska, United States
Yutan Subdistrict (玉谭街道), a subdistrict in Ningxiang County, Hunan, China
Yutan, Jilin (玉谭镇), a town in Nanguan District, Changchun, Jilin, China
Yutan Township, a township in Zongyang County, Anhui, China